Jörgen Lundgren is a Swedish former footballer who played as a defender.

References

Association football defenders
Swedish footballers
Allsvenskan players
Malmö FF players
Living people
Year of birth missing (living people)